Choked: Paisa Bolta Hai is a 2020 Indian Hindi-language drama film directed and co-produced by Anurag Kashyap, written by Nihit Bhave, and jointly produced by Netflix and Good Bad Films (in their debut production). The film stars Saiyami Kher and Roshan Mathew, with Amruta Subhash and Rajshri Deshpande appearing in supporting roles. Set against the backdrop of 2016 Indian banknote demonetisation, the film tells the story of a bank cashier who discovers a stash of cash hidden in her kitchen sink. It released on Netflix on 5 June 2020.

Plot

Sarita Pillai and Sushant Pillai are a married couple that live in a lower-middle-class neighborhood of Mumbai, trying to make ends meet with their young son. While the movie shows the daily struggles of a lower-middle-class family in Mumbai with all its up and downs, a flashback shows that Sarita and Sushant have a musical background and during a reality singing show, Sarita freezes onstage when the lights reveal a large audience. This past experience chokes her frequently, bringing stress and anxiety. Sarita is now the breadwinner of the family, working as a bank teller while Sushant remains frequently unemployed or engages in small schemes to make money with his neighbors. The burden on Sarita to work long hours at the bank with full responsibility at home causes frequent fights and issues between them. In midst of this, viewers learn that an unknown man brings a heavy suitcase in the same building as the Pillai's who rolls up large cash bundles in a ziploc bag and stuffs it in the bathroom drain. This hidden location is meant to imply hiding of black-money, which is learned to be the cause of choking the water sewage pipe, often causing unusual noises in Pillai's kitchen sink. One night, Sarita wakes up to drink water and she hears loud noises in the same pipe. She goes to check and starts to open and clean up the dirty water. To her surprise, she finds those hidden stuffed bags containing cash. She is astounded and after verifying the validity of the cash at her bank, she uses that cash to pay off Sushant's debt and indulge in buying high-end items for her home. Upon Sushant's inquiry, she responds that she has extra cash from her mother's fixed deposit.

Amidst this, episodes of the struggles of her neighbors and continued acrimony between them is shown. In particular, she shares a friendly yet stressful relationship with her neighbor downstairs, whom she adoringly calls Tai (meaning sister in Marathi). With nightly rituals of waking up and un-choking her kitchen pipeline, she continues to benefit from the new source of endless cash and uses it to indulge herself. However, all this free money ends abruptly, when she learns that Prime Minister Modi has introduced demonetization with banning notes of Rs. 500 and 1000. She and her neighbor Tai are distraught as Tai is preparing for her daughter's wedding and Sarita finds her free money ending, putting her back in the same struggle filled life that seemed to resolve with new money.

Sarita's life becomes even worse than before with angry customers, long hours and stress at the bank from the demonetization. Meanwhile, Sushant suspects that Sarita is having an extra-marital affair after being shown a video from Sarita's encounter with Reddy, a man from whom Sushant has borrowed money that Sarita had previously paid off from the "choked" money. Sarita goes to check the kitchen pipe and finds new currency notes of Rs. 2000 denomination, exciting her that despite cash restrictions imposed by the national government, she continues to get this "choked money" and uses it. Sarita goes to great lengths to hide this secret, even from Sushant by frequently locking up her kitchen and preventing unwanted guests from even sleeping in the kitchen.

Unfortunately for Sarita - her cash gathering comes to an abrupt end when thieves hold bank employees at gunpoint and steal all the money, including the cash that Sarita kept with her in her purse. She returns home saddened and dismayed that she loses at the most important moments in her life - during the reality singing show and now with this cash that gave her hope. Despite reassurance from Sushant, she hides the new money information and remains home. Unknown to her, the police are engaging in a criminal investigation into large sums of Rs. 2000 denomination notes haven been given to a local politician who extracted that from a corrupt bank officer in a different city. When questioned by the police, Sarita is dumbfounded, as she feels that her mere use of the "choked money" will now lead to an unnecessary criminal act against her as police inquire about the large sums of money that she had kept with her. However, Sushant intervenes and tells the police about the ziplock bagged money. During this revelation, the Pillai's neighbor deduce that the large bags being brought in their building were indeed by an assistant of the local politician that were actually newly minted money. They run up and take large sums of cash with them and return to their homes uncaught. After the police encounter the large bags of cash in the house of the assistant, then get Sushant's details.

One year later - upon returning from a trip, the Pillai's happily learn that they have been asked to come and collect 10% of the cash that the police encountered during their raid. Upon asking how much money that would be - the movie ends.

Cast
 Saiyami Kher as Sarita Pillai
 Roshan Mathew as Sushant Pillai
 Amruta Subhash as Sharvari Tai
 Rajshri Deshpande as Neeta
 Tawhid Rike Zaman as Neeta's Friend
 Tushar Dalvi as Bank manager
 Upendra Limaye as Reddy
 Milind Phatak as Joshi
 Uday Nene as Dinesh
 Vandana Marathe as Aatya
 Parthveer Shukla as Sameer Pillai
 Adithi Kalkunte as Rutu

Critical reception
The Indian Express gave the film a rating of 2 out of 5 stating that, "Choked doesn’t quite live up to its premise: it has some fine elements, but the connective tissue that binds it all together is a weak stretch." Anupama Chopra of Film Companion praised Anurag Kashyap's ability to get good performances from the cast but said that the film fell short from his previous filmography, "Essentially, Choked is Anurag in minor key. There are sporadic moments of stylistic flashiness but mostly the storytelling, like Sarita, is subdued. There is little of the raw, visceral energy we associate with the filmmaker. But as usual, he elicits solid performances from his actors." Baradwaj Rangan of Film Companion South wrote "The film is rife with symbols, ripe for readings. But when the plot kicks in, it goes all over the place".

Rohan Naahar from Hindustan Times gave a mixed response saying, "Choked might not be up there with the filmmaker’s finest, but it’s his most unusual movie since No Smoking — and it most certainly fulfils its duty and performs the Heimlich on a streamer that is gasping for air after a string of back-to-back blunders.." Shikhar Verma from High On Films gave a mixed review saying "In Choked, the theme and metaphors feel stamped-on rather than organically infused."

References

External links
 

2020 films
Films directed by Anurag Kashyap
Hindi-language Netflix original films
Indian direct-to-video films
2020 direct-to-video films
Films scored by Rachita Arora
Indian drama films
Films set in 2016
2020s Hindi-language films
2020 drama films
Hindi-language drama films